Dwarampudi Chandrasekhara Reddy is an Indian politician from YSR Congress Party. He was elected as the  MLA of Kakinada City Assembly Constituency in Andhra Pradesh Legislative Assembly on 30 May 2019 for the second term after 2009–2014. Dwarampudi won the seat with a margin of 14,111 votes by defeating sitting MLA Vanamadi Venkateswara Rao of TDP.

References

Living people
1973 births
YSR Congress Party politicians